Nusaý Stadium (formerly Nisa-Chandybil Stadium) is a stadium in Ashgabat, Turkmenistan. It is currently used mostly for football matches and serves as the home for FC Aşgabat and training of the Turkmenistan national football team. It has a capacity of 3000.

The venue hosted 2022 Turkmenistan Cup Final between FC Ahal and Şagadam FK.  and 2022 Turkmenistan Super Cup between Altyn Asyr FK and Şagadam FK.

References

Football venues in Turkmenistan
Sports venues in Ashgabat
Buildings and structures in Ashgabat